Karodpati (also called Millionaire) is a Hindi 1936 comedy film directed by Hemchander Chunder. The film was produced by New Theatres Ltd. Calcutta, and the music was composed by  R. C. Boral with the assistance of Pankaj Mullick. The lyrics were written by Kidar Sharma who also acted in the film. The film starred K. L. Saigal, Sardar Akhtar, Molina Devi, Pahari Sanyal, Nawab, Trilok Kapoor, Rajkumari, and Kidar Sharma. The film showcased K. L. Saigal performing a farcical-comedy role which was a different format from his normal tragedy based stories. The story revolves around a cinema-crazy young man who wins a lottery, leading to a series of comedic situations when his friends join him.

Plot
K. L. Saigal plays a cinema crazy young man obsessed with the allure of motion pictures.  On winning the lottery he decides to enter the film world. The functioning of the film-world is shown with humorous elements in everyday situations. He is joined by his friends leading to funny incidents.

Cast
K. L. Saigal
Sardar Akhtar
Molina Devi
Pahari Sanyal
Nawab
Jagdish Sethi
Trilok Kapoor
Rajkumari
Kidar Sharma
Amar Mullick
Devbala
Nemo
Durgadas Bannerjee

Soundtrack

References

External links

1936 films
1930s Hindi-language films
Indian black-and-white films
Films scored by Pankaj Mullick
Films scored by R. C. Boral
Karodpati kese bane